The men's 800 metres at the 1988 Summer Olympics in Seoul, South Korea had an entry list of 70 competitors from 53 nations, with nine qualifying heats (70), four second-round races (32) and two semifinals (16), before the final (8) took off on Monday September 26, 1988. The maximum number of athletes per nation had been set at 3 since the 1930 Olympic Congress. The event was won by Paul Ereng of Kenya, the first time a Kenyan runner had won the 800 metres; the nation had previously taken silver in 1968 and bronze in 1964 and 1972. Joaquim Cruz of Brazil did not defend his 1984 gold, finishing second; the silver medal made him the ninth man to win two medals in the event. Saïd Aouita took bronze, Morocco's first medal in the men's 800 metres.

Summary
The final started out as a battle for the pole as José Luiz Barbosa and his teammate Joaquim Cruz led through the first turn, with Nixon Kiprotich in close pursuit.  Barbosa was the first across the break line but Kiprotich ran hard down the backstretch to demand the lead.  At the beginning of the second turn, Cruz tried to get around Barbosa.  He was successful for a moment, the Barbosa accelerated and moved onto challenging position on Kiprotich's shoulder.  Coming off the second turn, Barbosa put a finishing move on Kiprotich, but it was only the first lap, Barbosa getting the bell at a fast 49.54.  Johnny Gray, known for this kind of destructive first lap was back in a more conservative fifth place, just behind Peter Elliott.  Through the third turn, Saïd Aouita came forward from lagging at the back to move into challenging position behind Elliott.  Paul Ereng followed Aouita from the back.  His head bobbing, Kiprotich strained past Barbosa down the backstretch, but Cruz and Elliott were right with him, the defending champion Cruz continuing and edging ahead in the middle of the final turn.  Kiprotich faded while Elliott and Aouita were challenging on Cruz's shoulder.  Weaving his way around Barbosa and then Kiprotich, Ereng moved behind Elliott.  Coming off the turn, Cruz accelerated, opening a 2-metre gap on his three pursuers, but his departure left a gap between Elliott and the curb, which Ereng gladly raced through.  With more speed than the others, Ereng drifted to the outside, passing a helpless Cruz, who could only turn and look at who was passing him.  Ereng ran away for gold while Cruz struggled.  Further to the outside, Aouita took a run at Elliott, but ran into his elbow.  Deterred for a moment, Aouita took a second run at Elliott, edging ahead for bronze, but too far back to catch Cruz for silver.

Background

This was the 21st appearance of the event, which is one of 12 athletics events to have been held at every Summer Olympics. Three finalists from 1984, including the champion, returned: gold medalist Joaquim Cruz of Brazil, fifth-place finisher Donato Sabia of Italy, and seventh-place finisher Johnny Gray of the United States. Saïd Aouita of Morocco was the favorite.

Thirteen nations had never had a competitor in the men's 800 metres before: Andora, Angola, Bangladesh, Bermuda, the People's Republic of China, Chinese Taipei, the Cook Islands, Cyprus, Fiji, Papua New Guinea, Qater, Saint Vincent and the Grenadines, and Zaire all appeared in the event for the first time. Great Britain made its 20th appearance, most among all nations, having had no competitors in the event only in the 1904 Games in St. Louis.

Competition format

The 1988 edition of the men's 800 metres was run over four rounds, a format that appeared only in 1960 before returning in 1984. The "fastest loser" system introduced in 1964 was used for the first round. There were nine first-round heats, each with 7 or 8 athletes; the top three runners in each heat as well as the next five fastest overall advanced to the semifinals. There were four quarterfinals, each of 8 athletes; the top four runners in each advanced to the semifinals. There were two semifinals with 8 athletes each; the top four runners in each semifinal advanced to the eight-man final.

Records

Prior to the competition, the existing World and Olympic records were as follows.

No world or Olympic records were set during the competition.

Schedule

All times are Korea Standard Time adjusted for daylight savings (UTC+10)

Results

Round 1

The first round was held on Friday, 23 September 1988.

Heat 1

Heat 2

Heat 3

Heat 4

Heat 5

Heat 6

Heat 7

Heat 8

Heat 9

Quarterfinals

The quarterfinals were held on Saturday, 24 September 1988.

Quarterfinal 1

Quarterfinal 2

Quarterfinal 3

Quarterfinal 4

Semifinals

The semifinals were held on Sunday, 25 September 1988.

Semifinal 1

Semifinal 2

Final

See also
 1986 Men's European Championships 800 metres (Stuttgart)
 1987 Men's World Championships 800 metres (Rome)
 1990 Men's European Championships 800 metres (Split)

References

External links
  Official Report

8
800 metres at the Olympics
Men's events at the 1988 Summer Olympics